Foster is an unincorporated community partly within the city of Sweet Home in Linn County, Oregon. It is located on the western end of the Foster Reservoir. A post office named Foster serves ZIP code 97345, which serves areas beyond the Sweet Home city limits on both the north and south sides of Foster Lake: on the north side, the area extends along the Middle Santiam River to the west end of Green Peter Lake; on the south, the area extends for several miles along the South Santiam River and U.S. Route 20.

Climate
This region experiences warm and dry summers, with no average monthly temperatures above 71.6 °F. According to the Köppen Climate Classification system, Foster has a warm-summer Mediterranean climate, abbreviated "CSB" on climate maps.

References 

Unincorporated communities in Linn County, Oregon
Unincorporated communities in Oregon